Arthur Nott (13 August 1881 – 28 December 1959) was an English cricketer. He played for Gloucestershire between 1903 and 1912.

References

1881 births
1959 deaths
English cricketers
Gloucestershire cricketers
Cricketers from Bristol